Timothy "Tim" Shaun Matthews, OAM (born 29 October 1974) is an Australian Paralympic athlete. He was born in the Victorian town of Orbost with exomphalos, a condition in which the abdomen develops outside the body; in his case, the condition affected other organs, including his liver. he was also born without a left arm and with some webbed fingers. He spent much of his early life at Melbourne's Royal Children's Hospital because the membrane protecting his exposed organs ruptured when he was two days old.

At the 1996 Atlanta Paralympics, he won a gold medal in the Men's 4x100 m Relay T42-46 event, for which he received a Medal of the Order of Australia. At the 2000 Sydney Games, he won gold medals and broke world records in the men's 4x100 m relay T46 and men's 4x400 m relay T46 events and bronze medals in the men's 100 m T46 and men's 200 m T46 events. That year, he received an Australian Sports Medal. At the 2004 Athens Games, he came seventh in the first heat of the Men's 100 m T46 - event and did not make the final.

Since 2008, Matthews has been the Australian Paralympic Committee's Manager for Pathways and Development. As part of this role, he manages the APC's Paralympic Talent Search program in Victoria and Tasmania.

He coaches 2012 Paralympians Kelly Cartwright, Katy Parrish and Jack Swift, and is former coach of Paralympian Michelle Errichiello.

References

External links
Athletics Australia Results

Paralympic athletes of Australia
Athletes (track and field) at the 1996 Summer Paralympics
Athletes (track and field) at the 2000 Summer Paralympics
Athletes (track and field) at the 2004 Summer Paralympics
Medalists at the 1996 Summer Paralympics
Medalists at the 2000 Summer Paralympics
Paralympic gold medalists for Australia
Paralympic bronze medalists for Australia
Sprinters with limb difference
Australian amputees
People from Orbost
Recipients of the Medal of the Order of Australia
Recipients of the Australian Sports Medal
1974 births
Living people
Paralympic medalists in athletics (track and field)
Australian male sprinters
Paralympic sprinters